Shintaro Masuda (枡田 慎太郎, born July 8, 1987 in Kyoto, Kyoto) is a Japanese professional baseball infielder for the Tohoku Rakuten Golden Eagles in Japan's Nippon Professional Baseball.

External links

1987 births
Honolulu Sharks players
Japanese expatriate baseball players in the United States
Living people
Nippon Professional Baseball infielders
Baseball people from Kyoto Prefecture
Tohoku Rakuten Golden Eagles players